Amparo Quintos Posadas-Sandoval (born March 16, 1987), better known as Paw Diaz is a Filipino former actress. She came to mainstream attention when she joined ABS-CBN's reality artist search, Star Circle Quest, where she emerged as a finalist.

Career
Diaz came to mainstream attention when she joined ABS-CBN's reality artist search, Star Circle Quest, where she emerged as a finalist.

She is known for doing afternoon dramas in supporting or special participation roles and became the lead role as Wilda Abrantes in the 2010 mini-afternoon series of Precious Hearts Romances Romance-Drama fiction author Martha Cecila in The Substitute Bride opposite Rafael Rosell. Her biggest break was playing the 1996 antagonist Soraya Montenegro who was originally portrayed by Character Actress Itatí Cantoral in the Remake Mexican International Television Hit Maria la del Barrio to the lead character with the title name portrayed by Erich Gonzales and originally played by Mexican Queen of Entertainment and Telenovela's Thalia which aired on the primetime slot in 2011.

She recently staged a brief comeback by landing a role in the Singaporean web series Asian Billionaires.

Filmography

Film
Can This Be Love - Ria (2005)
 All About Love (2006 film)
Eternity - Lilay (2006)
Paano Kita Iibigin - Maureen (2007)
In My Life (2009) as Cherry Salvacion
Pak! Pak! My Dr. Kwak! (2011) as Doctor Diaz

Television

Men's Magazine Covergirl
FHM Philippines - August 2009

References

1987 births
21st-century Filipino actresses
Filipino child actresses
Filipino film actresses
Filipino television actresses
Living people
People from San Pedro, Laguna
Actresses from Laguna (province)
Star Circle Quest participants
Star Magic
Members of Iglesia ni Cristo